The dwarf sanjika (Opsaridium tweddleorum) is an African freshwater fish species  in the family Cyprinidae. It is found in Malawi and Mozambique, living in Lake Malawi and the lower Zambezi River.

References

Opsaridium
Fish described in 1996
Cyprinid fish of Africa
Taxonomy articles created by Polbot